Silam is a state constituency in Sabah, Malaysia, that is represented in the Sabah State Legislative Assembly. Previously this constituency was named Lahad Datu before swaping change to named Silam from name of parlimentary on 17 July 2019 and presenting for the first time for snap election

History

Representation history

Election results

References 

Sabah state constituencies